Gasperini v. Center for Humanities, 518 U.S. 415 (1996), was a decision by the Supreme Court of the United States in which the Court further refined the Erie doctrine regarding when and how federal courts are to apply state law in cases brought under diversity jurisdiction. The Court held that the New York state rule applied.

Background of the case
The plaintiff, William Gasperini, was an American journalist and photographer for CBS News and the Christian Science Monitor who, during the course of seven years in Central America, took over 5,000 slide transparencies depicting war, political leaders and everyday life. In 1990, Gasperini supplied 300 of his original transparencies to The Center for Humanities for use in an educational video.  The center agreed to return the transparencies, but they were lost. Gasperini commenced suit in the United States District Court for the Southern District of New York, invoking diversity jurisdiction. The trial jury applied New York law and found for Gasperini, awarding him $450,000 in compensatory damages. The defendant moved for a new trial, asserting, among other things, excessiveness of the award. The district court dismissed the motion and the defendant appealed. The United States Court of Appeals for the Second Circuit vacated the judgment and remanded for a new trial, unless the plaintiff accepted a remittitur for $100,000. Gasperini petitioned and the Supreme Court granted certiorari.

Issue
The case involved an important issue of what standard of review should be used by a federal court in measuring the excessiveness of a jury verdict. The standard typically applied by federal courts was that a verdict was excessive if it "shocked the conscience of the court." New York had recently enacted legislation changing the standard as a part of a tort reform initiative, codifying in CPLR §5501(c) the standard that an award was excessive if it "deviates materially from what would be reasonable compensation." The question arose as to whether the standard was substantive or procedural, as the Erie Doctrine stipulated that the federal court should apply the substantive law of the state and federal procedural law.

The court's decision
Justice Ginsburg delivered the majority opinion of the Court, which held that the federal district court should apply the New York standard for excessiveness, reasoning that the case did not include a distinct choice between federal and state interests, but rather presented an opportunity to serve both interests. The federal interest lay primarily in discharging the Seventh Amendment, which precludes review of facts tried by a jury. The Second Circuit had reviewed the verdict against the New York excessiveness standard and thus ran afoul of the Seventh Amendment. Accordingly, the Court vacated the judgment of the Second Circuit and ordered the case remanded to the district court for a new trial so that the trial judge could test the jury's verdict against the state standard.

See also
 Erie Doctrine
 List of United States Supreme Court cases, volume 518

External links
 
 
 Summary of Gasperini v. Center for Humanities

United States Supreme Court cases
United States Supreme Court cases of the Rehnquist Court
Diversity jurisdiction case law
1996 in United States case law
Conflict of laws case law
United States Erie Doctrine